Philip Henry Howard (22 April 1801 – 1 January 1883), was a British Whig politician.

A member of the Howard family headed by the Duke of Norfolk, he was the son of Henry Howard, of Corby Castle, Cumberland, by Catherine Mary, daughter of Sir Richard Neave, 1st Baronet. He was a descendant of Lord William Howard, younger son of Thomas Howard, 4th Duke of Norfolk.

Howard was returned to parliament as one of two representatives for Carlisle in 1830. He lost his seat in July 1847 but the election was declared void in March 1848 and in that same month he was once again elected for the constituency. This time he held the seat until 1852. He was appointed High Sheriff of Cumberland for 1860–61.

Howard married Elizabeth, daughter of Major John Canning, in 1843. They lived at Corby Castle. Elizabeth died in February 1865. Howard remained a widower until his death in January 1883, aged 81.

References

External links

1801 births
1883 deaths
Philip Henry
Members of the Parliament of the United Kingdom for English constituencies
UK MPs 1830–1831
UK MPs 1831–1832
UK MPs 1832–1835
UK MPs 1835–1837
UK MPs 1837–1841
UK MPs 1841–1847
UK MPs 1847–1852
Whig (British political party) MPs for English constituencies
High Sheriffs of Cumberland